Joseph R. Jennings is an American art director. He was nominated for an Academy Award in the category Best Art Direction for the film Star Trek: The Motion Picture.

Awards

Selected filmography

References

External links

Year of birth missing
Possibly living people
American art directors